The Akrofi-Christaller Institute of Theology, Mission and Culture (ACI), formerly known as the Akrofi-Christaller Memorial Centre for Mission Research and Applied Theology, is a tertiary, postgraduate research and training institute located in Akropong-Akuapem in Ghana. The institute was set up to study and document Christian religious thought, history and theology through the lens of culture, historiography and life in Ghanaian society and Africa as well as scholarship on ecumenical relations between the continent and the rest of the world.

History 
Akrofi-Christaller institute was founded in 1987 as an independent, self-financing entity, a company limited by guarantee and registered under the Companies Code as a non-profit educational institution. It is fully accredited by the National Accreditation Board of Ghana's Ministry of Education, with a full Presidential Charter to award its own degrees.

The university was named after two Christian ethnologists, Johann Gottlieb Christaller and Clement Anderson Akrofi who carried out extensive literary work on the Twi language. With roots in the Pietistic tradition of the Basel Mission, the Institute combines academic study with propagation of the Gospel in Ghana and Africa.

Akrofi-Christaller Institute occupies the buildings of the historic Akropong Seminary including the Basel House in Akropong-Akuapem, a campus that was built in the mid-nineteenth century, renovated in the early nineties and expanded by the turn of the millennium. The upgrade of the facilities include residential and dining buildings, a specialist reference library - the Johannes Zimmermann Library and lecture halls.

Notable alumni 

 Kwabena Opuni Frimpong - former General Secretary,  Christian Council of Ghana

See also 

 Education in Ghana
 Presbyterian College of Education, Akropong
 Presbyterian Women's College of Education
 Salem School, Osu
 Trinity Theological Seminary, Legon

References

External links 
 

Education in Ghana
Educational institutions established in 1987
Christian schools in Ghana
Presbyterian schools in Africa
Akrofi-Christaller Institute alumni
1987 establishments in Ghana